Ben Antao is a writer who was born in Velim, Goa, India. He has worked as a journalist, teacher, writer and certified financial planner. He lives in Toronto, Canada.

Education and journalism
He graduated from the University of Bombay (M.A. in English) and worked as a reporter for The Navhind Times, Panjim, Goa (1963–64) and later joined The Indian Express (1965–66) in Bombay as a reporter. In 1966, he was awarded a journalism fellowship by the World Press Institute based at Macalester College, St. Paul, MN, for a year of study and travel in the United States. While in the US, he worked for ten weeks as a writer and editor for The Denver Post, CO. After immigrating to Canada in 1967, he worked for The Catholic Register weekly and The Globe and Mail, both of Toronto.

Teaching
In 1976, he graduated from the University of Toronto (B.Ed) and switched to a teaching career. He retired from teaching English in high school in 1998.

Writing
In 1990, he published Images of Goa, a memoir of his early life and experiences in his native land. In 2004, he published Goa, A Rediscovery, a travelogue of his visit to Goa. He has written five novels, over two dozen short stories, a play and a movie script based on his novel The Tailor's Daughter. His other novels are Blood & Nemesis, Penance, Living on the Market, The Priest and His Karma, and Money and Politics. His non-fiction includes two memoirs: Images of Goa (2011, 2ed) and Images of the USA (2009), and two travelogues: Goa, A Rediscovery (2004) and The Lands of Sicily (2008).

He is a past president of the Canadian Authors Association (Toronto branch).

References

Canadian male novelists
Canadian male short story writers
Canadian memoirists
Canadian people of Goan descent
Writers from Toronto
Indian emigrants to Canada
Living people
20th-century Canadian novelists
21st-century Canadian novelists
20th-century Canadian dramatists and playwrights
21st-century Canadian dramatists and playwrights
Canadian male dramatists and playwrights
20th-century Canadian short story writers
21st-century Canadian short story writers
1935 births
20th-century Indian novelists
Indian male novelists
Novelists from Goa
People from North Goa district
20th-century Canadian male writers
21st-century Canadian male writers
Canadian male non-fiction writers